The Windhoek Country Club Resort is a multi-use resort outside of Windhoek, Namibia owned by Legacy Hotels and Resorts International. The Resort was opened in May 1995 and was home to the 1995 Miss Universe Pageant. The resort's golf course is home to the yearly Bank Windhoek Namibian Open Golf Tournament. The Hotel consists of 152 rooms, of which 18 are family rooms, 39 are luxury, 87 are twin, 7 suites and 1 paraplegic room.  The resort also includes a casino.

Many of the main boxing events and title fights in Namibia take place at the resort.

The Windhoek Country Club Resort is a member of the Hospitality Association of Namibia.

External links 

 https://namibia-getaways.com/ect/windhoek-country-club-resort/
Official site

Hotel buildings completed in 1995
Hotels in Namibia
Buildings and structures in Windhoek
Hotels established in 1995
Golf clubs and courses in Namibia
Sports venues completed in 1995